Ervin Hoffmann is a Hungarian sprint canoeist who competed from the late 1980s to the late 1990s. He won 11 medals at the ICF Canoe Sprint World Championships with four golds (C-4 200 m: 1995, C-4 500 m: 1993, 1994, 1995) and seven silvers (C-1 200 m: 1994, C-4 200 m: 1994, 1997; C-4 500 m: 1989, 1990; C-4 1000 m: 1989, 1990).

References

Hungarian male canoeists
Living people
Year of birth missing (living people)
ICF Canoe Sprint World Championships medalists in Canadian
20th-century Hungarian people